= Mongolian Human Resources Institute =

Business organization based in Mongolia

The Mongolian Human Resources Institute (Mongolian: Монголын Хүний Нөөцийн Институт) is a non-governmental organization which was established in December 2006. The main purpose of the institute is to implement the International management experience of the Human Resource policy into Mongolian market and processing Mongolian-based management through developing accurate policy of Human resources as well as providing specific training seminars related with HR and make appropriate research work related with Mongolian labor market. The foremost vision of MHRI is to contribute to Mongolian economics and industry development through the continuous collaboration with all organizations, students, factories, doctor and students who have strong desire to develop accurate policy of Human resource and processing and implementing the Mongolian-based management.
